The Kosal region of India had been a prosperous land with abundant natural resources and a self-sufficient economy. Flooding was not a very well known occurrence in the region; however, there were many occasions of droughts.
 
The Hirakud Dam, as well as others, was built by the government primarily to decrease the damage by flooding in Coastal Odisha and to facilitate irrigation in the Kosal region. As most of the dams were built in Western Odisha, many villages were displaced. Moreover, the displaced people, mainly farmers, were not given compensation for damages.
 
The displaced people migrated to other places such as in Jharsuguda, Sambalpur, Bargarh, Sonepur, Angul, and the Boudh district. After losing their land and not being compensated, said displaced people bought land and lived on small income generated from their small land holdings. Irrigation and rain saved these people from facing severe sustained drought. 
 
Forest coverage of the catchment area of Hirakud Dam which lies mostly in Chhattisgarh, has declined drastically which is evident from browsing catchment area of the Hirakud on Google Earth. Most of the perennial water sources and streams come from the Bauxite holding Mountains due to the water affinity of the mineral.  As bauxite and iron ores are being extracted, the water-holding capacity of these have declined causing siltation and flash floods during rain and drought during summer.  Adding to it unsustainable industrialization and use of water resources by Industry the irrigation in this region has suffered. High level of Pollution due to many small and large industries and indiscriminate deforestation has decreased precipitation and has increased diseases leading either to decrease in yield or loss of crop.  
 
The state government assured farmers in the Kosal region that irrigation in the Hirakud command area would not be adversely affected by industrialization. However, the government has taken all steps to facilitate use of water for industrial use which was actually meant for farmers. Though the industries have huge financial resources to source their own water supply or to increase the water holding capacity of Hirakud, the government has not taken the necessary steps to improve water supplies to the villages and farms.

It is reported that more than 60 farmers in Western Odisha have committed suicide.  It is also reported that forty-three farmers killed themselves towards the end of 2009. Some of the reasons for farmer suicide are: all of them were small farmers, entirely dependent on monsoons for irrigation, sudden Inflation had limited their access to expensive fertilizers and pesticides and all of them had borrowed from moneylenders between Rs 10,000 to 25,000 at exorbitant rates, some as high as 25 per cent.

The issue over farmers' suicide in Western Odisha is heating up. The Biju Janata Dal had sent a three-member fact-finding team to Sagarpalli village in Jharsuguda district to meet the family members and assess the situation. Perturbed over oppositions' attempts to make it issue, BJD decided to send a team for assuaging farmers. It was also reported that a team of high-level Bharatiya Janata Party leaders, led by State president Suresh Pujari, visited Khapsadea village in Sambalpur district where a farmer committed suicide in the first week of October 7. The Odisha government has also ordered a probe into farmers suicide.

See also
 Farmers' suicides in India

References

External links
 The spectre of farmers' suicides
 Farmers are committing suicide in western Odisha :Kosal Discussion and Development Forum
 Farmers committing suicide due to crop failure in western Orissa, Govt refuses 
 Congress MP demands separate W Orissa state
 Farmers threaten mass suicide
 List of Farmers committed suicide in Orissa

History of Odisha (1947–present)
Odisha
Global issues